Río Prieto may refer to:

Rivers
 Río Prieto (Lares, Puerto Rico)
 Río Prieto (Maricao, Puerto Rico)
 Río Prieto (Naguabo, Puerto Rico)
 Río Prieto (Ponce, Puerto Rico)
 Río Prieto (Yabucoa, Puerto Rico)

Other uses
 Río Prieto, Lares, Puerto Rico, a barrio
 Río Prieto, Yauco, Puerto Rico, a barrio
 Rio Preto State Park, Minas Gerais, Brazil

See also
 Rio Preto (disambiguation)